Clube Atlético Universitário, commonly known as Universitário, is a Brazilian football club based in Santo Antônio de Jesus, Bahia state.

History
The club was founded on January 12, 1997. Universitário won the Campeonato Baiano Second Level in 2007.

Achievements

 Campeonato Baiano Second Level:
 Winners (1): 2007

Stadium

Clube Atlético Universitário play their home games at Estádio José Trindade Lobo. The stadium has a maximum capacity of 3,000 people.

References

Association football clubs established in 1997
Football clubs in Bahia
1997 establishments in Brazil